Scottsdale Exchange is a bus loop located in the Strawberry Hill neighbourhood of Newton in Surrey, British Columbia, Canada. As part of the TransLink system, it serves the western Newton and North Delta areas with routes to Richmond, Ladner, New Westminster, Surrey City Centre, and Langley City that provide connections to several SkyTrain stations for travel towards Vancouver.

Structure and location 
The original Scottsdale Exchanged opened on May 30, 1975, and was located on-street just outside Scottsdale Mall on 70 Avenue and Nicholson Road, just west of Scott Road on the Delta side of the Surrey–Delta boundary. On December 14, 1998, the exchange was relocated to its current site near the 7400 block of 120 Street (Scott Road) in Surrey.

Scottsdale Exchange serves the nearby shopping centres of Scottsdale and Strawberry Hill, which includes a Cineplex movie theatre. It also functions as an important connector for commuters living in the surrounding residential areas, as well as the broader South of Fraser region. There are several open-sided shelters with benches on-site. It has the ability to host regular length diesel buses, community shuttles, articulated and double-decker buses.

Routes
, the following routes serve Scottsdale Exchange:

See also
List of bus routes in Metro Vancouver

References

External links

TransLink (British Columbia) bus stations
Transport in Surrey, British Columbia
1975 establishments in British Columbia